Wadapind (also spelled Wada pind or Bara pind) is a village in Gujrat District, Pakistan, close to the border with Azad Kashmir. The post office serving this village is in Karianwala. Wadapind is noted for its annual events such as the fun fairs and Melas. A new road was constructed to the benefit of local inhabitants, and infrastructure  such as internet and electricity are available. However, there is no gas supply to the village, and there is a need for further development.

Villages in Gujrat District